Ilsley  (or Isley, or Ilsley and Razor) was a privateer schooner commanded by Captain Ephraim Sturdivant during the War of 1812. She was commissioned as a privateer on 20 April 1813. Although there may have been two vessels of the same name, Isley captured four brigs, two schooners, and a sloop before  captured her at sea.

Citations and references

Citations

References
Emmons, George Foster (1853) The navy of the United States, from the commencement, 1775 to 1853; with a brief history of each vessel’s service and fate ... Comp. by Lieut. George F. Emmons ... under the authority of the Navy Dept. To which is added a list of private armed vessels, fitted out under the American flag ... also a list of the revenue and coast survey vessels, and principal ocean steamers, belonging to citizens of the United States in 1850. (Washington: Gideon & Co.)
Portland Privateers of the War of 1812

Privateer ships of the United States
Schooners of the United States
War of 1812 ships of the United States
1810s ships